Larger Than Live is the fifth studio album by heavy metal band Keel. It was released in 1989 on Gold Mountain Records. The album consists of six new studio tracks and six of the band's previous songs recorded live at The Roxy in West Hollywood, CA. It was also the only album to feature future Dio keyboardist Scott Warren and guitarist Tony Palamucci (as guitarist Marc Ferrari left the band due to creative and personal differences).

Following the filming of the music video for the song "Dreams Are Not Enough," lead vocalist/founder Ron Keel announced the disbandment of Keel.

Track listing
Side one - studio
 "Evil Wicked Mean & Nasty" (Ron Keel) - 4:21
 "Riding High" (Dwain Miller, Kenny Chaisson, R. Keel, Scott Warren) - 3:24
 "Die Fighting" (R. Keel) - 4:40
 "Dreams Are Not Enough" (Phil Wolfe, R. Keel) - 4:16
 "So Many Good Ways to Be Bad" (R. Keel, Steve Diamond) - 4:08
 "Fool for a Pretty Face" (Jerry Shirley, Steve Marriott) - 4:18 (Humble Pie cover)

Side two - live
"Hard as Hell" (R. Keel) - 4:06
 "Rock and Roll Animal" (Marc Ferrari) - 6:15
 "Private Lies" (R. Keel) - 4:38
 "Rock 'n Roll Outlaw" (Gary Anderson, Mick Cocks, Peter Wells) - 4:12 (Rose Tattoo cover)
 "The Right to Rock" (Bryan Jay, Kenny Chaisson, Ferrari, R. Keel) - 6:06
 "Cold Day in Hell" (R. Keel) - 4:29 (Steeler cover)

Tracks 1-6 are new studio tracks, tracks 7-12 are live recordings.

Personnel
Band members
 Ron Keel - lead vocals, guitar, producer
 Tony "The Kid" Palamucci - guitars, backing vocals
 Bryan Jay - guitars, backing vocals (on tracks 7-12)
 Kenny Chaisson - bass, backing vocals
 Scott Warren - keyboards, piano, backing vocals
 Dwain Miller - drums, backing vocals

Additional musicians
Jaime St. James, Kevin Dubrow - backing vocals on track 6
Bryan Jenkins - backing vocals
Paula Salvatore - harmony vocals on track 5

Production
Allen Isaacs - producer, engineer on tracks 1-6
Bryan Jenkins - engineer on tracks 1-6
Jaimie Seyberth, John Falzarano, Ray Thompson - live recording of tracks 7-12
Greg Fulginti - mastering

References

Keel (band) albums
1989 live albums
Albums recorded at Sound City Studios